The 2005 season was the 1st season of competitive football by Universidad San Martín de Porres.

Statistics

Appearances and goals

Competition Overload

Primera División Peruana 2004

Apertura 2004

Clausura 2004

Pre-season friendlies

Transfers

In

Out

External links 
 Everything about Deportivo Universidad San Martín
 Deportivo Universidad San Martín de Porres - season 2004

2004
2004 in Peruvian football